In anatomy, a canal (or canalis in Latin) is a tubular passage or channel which connects different regions of the body.

Examples include:

 Cranial Region
 Alveolar canals
 Carotid canal
 Facial canal
 Greater palatine canal
 Incisive canals
 Infraorbital canal
 Mandibular canal
 Optic canal
 Palatovaginal canal
 Pterygoid canal
 Abdominal Region
 Inguinal canal
 Pelvic Region
 Anal canal
 Pudendal canal
 Upper Extremities
 Suprascapular canal
 Carpal canal
 Ulnar canal
 Radial canal
 Lower Extremities
 Adductor canal 
 Femoral canal 
 Obturator canal

See also
 Foramen
 Canaliculus

References
Dorland's Illustrated Medical Dictionary, 27th ed. 1988 W.B. Saunders Company. Philadelphia, PA.

Anatomy